The UAE German Supercup is an association football match between a team from the German Bundesliga and a team from the United Arab Emirates. The first competition was held in 2010.

UAE German Supercup

  Instead of Al-Wahda FC
  There was a match in 2012 but it is not sure whether it was a match for the UAE German Supercup or not. (VfL Wolfsburg 3:1 Al Jazira Club)
  There was a match in 2013 but it is not sure whether if it is a match for the UAE German Supercup or not. (Eintracht Frankfurt 4:5 Al Jazira Club)
  There only was an intra-German match in 2014 in Abu Dhabi (Eintracht Frankfurt 2:3 FC Schalke 04)
  There was an intra-German match in 2015 in Abu Dhabi (Eintracht Frankfurt vs. Hamburger SV 3:2) and Frankfurt played against Al Ain (1:0). There was also a match in Belek between Werder Bremen and Al-Fujairah SC (3:1). But it is not if any of this games is a UAE German Supercup game.
  There only was an intra-German match in 2016 in Abu Dhabi (Eintracht Frankfurt 0:4 Borussia Dortmund) in Dubai.

References

External links
 Goalzz.com

2010 establishments in the United Arab Emirates
2010 establishments in Germany
Germany–United Arab Emirates relations